The former Associate Reformed Presbyterian Church is a historic church building at 3323 W. 12th St. in Little Rock, Arkansas. It is a one and a half-story brick structure, with a striking full-height Greek temple front, that has six Ionic columns supporting a fully pedimented gable with small octagonal window at its center. It was built in 1925 to a design by noted Arkansas architect Charles L. Thompson, and is the only one of his church designs known to use the Greek temple front.

Since 1976 the building has housed Emmanuel Baptist Church, a century old African-American\ congregation.

The building was listed on the National Register of Historic Places in 1982.

See also
National Register of Historic Places listings in Little Rock, Arkansas

References

Churches on the National Register of Historic Places in Arkansas
Neoclassical architecture in Arkansas
Churches completed in 1925
20th-century Presbyterian church buildings in the United States
Churches in Little Rock, Arkansas
National Register of Historic Places in Little Rock, Arkansas
Neoclassical church buildings in the United States